Stotra (Sanskrit: स्तोत्र) is a Sanskrit word that means "ode, eulogy or a hymn of praise." It is a literary genre of Indian religious texts designed to be melodically sung, in contrast to a shastra which is composed to be recited.

A stotra can be a prayer, a description, or a conversation, but always with a poetic structure. It may be a simple poem expressing praise and personal devotion to a deity for example, or poems with embedded spiritual and philosophical doctrines.

Many stotra hymns praise aspects of the divine, such as Devi, Shiva, or Vishnu. Relating to word "stuti", coming from the same Sanskrit root *stu- ("to praise"), and basically both mean "praise". Notable stotras are Shiva Tandava Stotram in praise of Shiva and Rama Raksha Stotra, a prayer for protection to Rama.

Stotras are a type of popular devotional literature. Among the early texts with Stotras are by Kuresha, which combine Ramanuja's Vedantic ideas on qualified monism about Atman and Brahman (ultimate, unchanging reality), with temple practices.

Etymology
Stotra comes from the Sanskrit root stu- which means "to praise, eulogize or laud". Literally, the term refers to "poems of praise". The earliest trace of stotras are Vedic, particularly in the Samaveda.

Example

The following is a Peterson translation of a Stotra by the Tamil poet Appar for Ardhanarishvara, the Hindu concept of a god who incorporates both the masculine and the feminine as inseparable halves.

Nama-stotra 
The nama-stotra is based on chanting a litany of names for a deity.  The Sahasranama, a type of nama-stotra, is a litany of a thousand names for a particular deity. Sahasranama means "1000 names"; Sahasra means 1000 and nama means names.  For example, Vishnu Sahasranama means 1000 names of Vishnu. Other nama-stotras may include 100 or 108 epithets of the deity. According to Hinduism, the names of God are valuable tools for devotion.

Notable stotras
 Shiva Tandava Stotram
 Dakshinamurti Stotram
 Shri Hari Stotram
 Shiv Mahimna Stotra
 Panchakshara Stotra
 Ram Raksha Stotra
 Mahishasuramardini Stotra
 Maruti Stotra
 Agasti Lakshmi Stotra
 Dvadasha Stotra
 Radha Sahasranama Stotra
 Narasimha Kavacham Stotra
Jainism
Bhaktamara Stotra

See also
Khadgamala
List of suktas and stutis

References

Bibliography

External links 
Read Stotras in multiple languages
Alphabetical List of the Stotras

Hindu devotional texts
Hindu texts
Chants
Hymns